Peter O'Brian, born Peter John Wilson, is a New Zealand-Indonesian actor best known for playing Alex Tarambuan in the movie The Intruder. He is not to be confused with the Australian actor Peter O'Brien.

O'Brian has only featured in strictly Indonesian productions. Nearly all of his movies have involved Arizal or the Indonesian producers The Punjabi Brothers; he has also worked closely with Jopi Burnama. The Stabilizer was O'Brian's first movie.

Filmography
The Stabilizer (1986) [Segi Tiga Emas]
The Intruder (1986) [Pembalasan Rambu]
Forceful Impact (1987) [Arizal]
Jungle Heat (1988) [Rimba Panas]
Double Crosser (1989) [Membakar Lingkaran Api]
Lethal Hunter aka American Hunter (1990) [Pemburu Berdarah Dingin]
Triple Cross aka Angel of Fury (1990) [Pertempuran Segi Tiga]
Time Game (1998) [Sanu Samtani (Rapi Film)]
Operation: RAMBU! (Documentary) (2019)

References

External links

New Zealand male film actors
Living people
Year of birth missing (living people)